Țibucani is a commune in Neamț County, Western Moldavia, Romania. It is composed of three villages: Davideni, Țibucani and Țibucanii de Jos.

References

Communes in Neamț County
Localities in Western Moldavia